The Fort Lewis Skyhawks are the athletic teams that represent Fort Lewis College, located in Durango, Colorado, in NCAA Division II intercollegiate sports. The Skyhawks compete as members of the Rocky Mountain Athletic Conference for all 11 varsity sports. The college's teams were previously known as the Beavers, Aggies, and Raiders.

Athletic facilities
Facilities include the 4,000 seat Ray Dennison Memorial Field for football and lacrosse, the 2,750–seat Whalen Gymnasium for men's and women's basketball and women's volleyball, Aspen Field for softball, and Dirks Field, with a seating capacity of 2,000 for men's and women's soccer.

Varsity sports

Teams

Men's sports
 Basketball
 Cross Country
 Football
 Golf
 Soccer
 Outdoor Track

Women's sports
 Golf
 Basketball
 Cross Country
 Lacrosse
 Soccer
 Softball
 Track & Field
 Volleyball
 Outdoor Track
 Cheer

Basketball
The Skyhawks women's basketball team earned a berth in the NCAA Division II national title game in 2010.

Golf 
The men's golf team reached the NCAA Division II Championships in the 2010-2011 season.

Soccer 

The Fort Lewis College men's soccer team won the 2011 NCAA Division II Men’s Soccer National Championships. The win was the team's third NCAA Division II national championship, having won in 2005, 2009, and 2011. The Skyhawks men's soccer team also reached the finals and were national runners-up in 1999 and 2006.

National championships

Team

Club, intramural, and non-NCAA sports 
Club sports teams are organized, coached, and administered by student team members and play intercollegiate schedules. Club sports include baseball, cycling, women's golf, men's lacrosse, men's and women's rugby, ski & snowboard, men's and women's soccer, tennis, track & field, and ultimate frisbee. Intramural sports offered include basketball, flag football, softball, soccer, volleyball, kickball, dodgeball, ultimate frisbee, badminton, and tennis.

Cycling  

The Fort Lewis College Cycling team, a club sport, races in the USA Collegiate Cycling Division I as a member of the Rocky Mountain Collegiate Cycling Conference, and was ranked first in the nation after the 2009-2010, 2010-2011, and 2011-2012 seasons. The team competes in track, mountain biking, cyclocross, road, and BMX disciplines, and has won 23 team national championships in those disciplines since 1995.

References

External links